Synemon theresa, the cryptic sun moth, is a moth in the Castniidae family. It is found in Australia, including South Australia and Victoria.

The wingspan is about 30 mm for males and 35 mm for females. The upper side of the anterior wings is greyish, the disc varied with longitudinal pale and fuscous dashes, beyond the middle the pale dashes almost form a transverse band, followed by a series of dark spots. The margin is brown slightly varied with white. The posterior wings are fulvous brown at the base, marked with a clear fulvous spot, beyond this, fulvous with a transverse macular band, the margin itself black. On the underside, the anterior wings are orange, with the outer margin narrowly black, with three or four black spots before the apex. The posterior wings are greyish in the male, in the female nearly as above, but paler. The head, thorax and abdomen grey above and whitish below. The antennae are black, ringed with white.

Adults are on wing from mid-December to early January.

The larvae possibly feed on Austrodanthonia species.

References

Moths described in 1846
Castniidae